Gokulnath, also known Ambuli Gokulnath, is an Indian choreographer and actor who has appeared in Tamil language films.

Career
He began his career as a graphic designer, before working as a mime artist and dancer in various reality shows such as Kalakapovadhu Yaaru, Maanada Mayilada and Naalaya Iyakkunar. He subsequently moved on to work in Tamil cinema, playing pivotal roles in films including Ambuli, Aaah and Jumbulingam 3D.

Filmography

References

Male actors from Chennai
Living people
1984 births
Male actors in Tamil cinema
Indian male film actors
Tamil male actors